Neodymium(III) perchlorate is an inorganic compound. It is a salt of neodymium and perchloric acid with the chemical formula of Nd(ClO4)3 – it is soluble in water, forming purple-pink, hydrated crystals.

Properties

Physical properties 

Neodymium(III) perchlorate forms pale purple crystals when in its anhydrous form.

It is soluble in water.

It forms crystals Nd(ClO4)3·nH2O, where n = 4, 4.5 are purple-pink crystals, and n = 6 forms pale pink to lavender crystals.

Alkaline salts 

Nd(ClO4)3 can form alkaline salts, with the general formula of Nd(OH)x(ClO4)3 − x. The salt with x = 1.5 (saturated with 5 water atoms) is a light purple crystal with d = 2.88 g/cm³.

Other compounds 
Nd(ClO4)3 can form compounds with hydrazine, such as Nd(ClO4)3·6N2H4·4H2O which is a small white crystal that is soluble in water, methanol, ethanol and acetone, and insoluble in toluene, with density of 2,3271 g/cm³ at 20 °C.

References 

Perchlorates
Neodymium compounds